Joost de Blank (14 November 1908 – 1 January 1968) was a Dutch-born British Anglican bishop. He was the Archbishop of Cape Town, South Africa from 1957 to 1963 and was known as the "scourge of apartheid" for his ardent opposition to the whites-only policies of the South African government.

Education 
De Blank was born in Rotterdam, Netherlands, on 14 November 1908, he became a British subject as a child in 1921. He was educated at Merchant Taylors' School, King's College London, and Queens' College, Cambridge.

Clerical career 
He was ordained after a period of study at Ridley Hall, Cambridge in 1932 and began his career as a Curate in Bath. De Blank held incumbencies at Forest Gate and Greenhill, Harrow. During World War II he was an army chaplain.

In 1952 he was appointed the Bishop of Stepney in the Diocese of London and continued in this post until he was translated to Cape Town.

During this bishopric, de Blank, visited Ruth Ellis in prison just before she was hanged, for the murder of David Blakeley in 1955, when she told him, "It is quite clear to me that I was not the person who shot him. When I saw myself with the revolver I knew I was another person." These comments were quoted in a London evening paper of the time, The Star.

South Africa 
He succeeded Geoffrey Clayton as Archbishop of Cape Town in 1957. In South Africa, he refused to preach in any church not open to blacks as well as whites. He opposed clause 29 of Natives Law Amendment Bill, which gave the civil authorities powers to exclude non-whites from Anglican churches. In 1960 De Blank called on the Dutch Reformed Church in South Africa (NGK) to repudiate apartheid, and in the same year criticised the South African jubilee celebrations: "This is no time for rejoicing, but for shame".

De Blank suffered a stroke which caused him to resign from Cape Town in 1963. He returned to Britain whereupon he was appointed a residentiary canon of Westminster Abbey.

Honours and awards 
 Appointed a sub-prelate of the Venerable Order of Saint John in 1952.
 Appointed canon of Westminster Abbey in 1964.

De Blank died at Westminster on 1 January 1968 and was buried in Westminster Abbey.

Styles
The Reverend Joost de Blank (1932–1952)
The Right Reverend Joost de Blank (1952–1957 & 1963–1968)
The Most Reverend Joost de Blank (1957–1963)

Publications

Notes and references

External links
 Archive of Joost de Blank, archbishop of Cape Town held at the Borthwick Institute for Archives, University of York 

 Commemoration at Westminster Abbey

1908 births
1968 deaths
20th-century Anglican archbishops
Alumni of King's College London
Alumni of Queens' College, Cambridge
Anglican archbishops of Cape Town
Bishops of Stepney
Burials at Westminster Abbey
Canons of Westminster
People educated at Merchant Taylors' School, Northwood
People from Cape Town
Blank, Joost de
20th-century Church of England bishops
South African Anglicans
South African people of Dutch descent
Sub-Prelates of the Venerable Order of Saint John